Salpaus Further Education (Koulutuskeskus Salpaus or Salpaus) is a regional college providing vocational education and training, staff development services and general upper secondary education in the Lahti region, Päijänne Tavastia province, Finland. Salpaus operates in six different locations, in Lahti, Asikkala, Heinola, Hollola, Nastola and Orimattila.

Salpaus provides vocational upper-secondary and adult education and training in the fields defined by the Ministry of Education:
 Culture
 Humanities and education 
 Natural resources and the environment
 Natural sciences
 Social science, business and administration
 Social services, health and sport
 Technology, communication and transport
 Tourism, catering and domestic services

Salpaus Further Education is an independent division of Lahti Region Educational Consortium with divisions of Lahti University of Applied Sciences and Tuoterengas. Salpaus Further Education employs approximately 640 teachers and other staff.

Fields of Study

External links 
 Salpaus Further Education Website
 Lahti Region Educational Consortium Website

Education in Päijät-Häme
Organizations established in 2001
2001 establishments in Finland
Educational organisations based in Finland